Thomas Knight (born December 29, 1974) is a former American football cornerback in the National Football League. He was drafted by the Arizona Cardinals in the 1st round of the 1997 NFL Draft. He also played for the Baltimore Ravens.

Knight played at Cherokee High School in the Marlton section of Evesham Township, New Jersey and was selected all-South Jersey. Knight received a full scholarship from Iowa to play football in 1991.

References

1974 births
Living people
Cherokee High School (New Jersey) alumni
People from Evesham Township, New Jersey
Players of American football from New Jersey
Sportspeople from Burlington County, New Jersey
Sportspeople from Summit, New Jersey
American football cornerbacks
Iowa Hawkeyes football players
Arizona Cardinals players
Baltimore Ravens players
St. Louis Rams players